Daniel Wells may refer to:

Dan Wells (actor) (born 1973), American television and motion picture actor
Dan Wells (author) (born 1977), American horror novelist
Dan Wells (racing driver) (born 1991), British racing driver
Daniel H. Wells (1814–1891), apostle of The Church of Jesus Christ of Latter-day Saints, and mayor of Salt Lake City, Utah
Daniel Wells (cricketer) (born 1995), English cricketer
Daniel Wells (footballer) (born 1985), Australian rules footballer
Daniel Wells, Jr. (1808–1902), U.S. Representative from Wisconsin
Daniel Wells (snooker player) (born 1988), Welsh snooker player
Danny Wells (1941–2013), Canadian movie and television character actor
Danny Wells (politician) (born 1940), American politician in West Virginia